The 1986–87 season was Newport County's seventh consecutive season in the Third Division, their 40th in the third tier and 59th overall in the Football League. They finished the season in 24th place and were relegated to the Fourth Division for the 1987–88 season.

Caretaker manager John Relish surprisingly wasn't chosen to continue as manager despite saving the club from relegation the previous year, and Jimmy Mullen was instead brought in as player-manager. The club started the season okay, albeit somewhat inconsistently, and occupied mid-table until the start of November. Things went horribly wrong after that however, and the club ensured a second successive season spending three months without a win. A 1–0 win over Doncaster on Valentine's Day saw a temporary improvement in form, but a 5–2 thumping at the hands of Notts County cost Mullen his job, with John Lewis stepping up to the manager's job for the rest of the season. The club picked up enough points here and there to maintain an outside chance of survival until the final weeks of the season, but a dismal return of just one point from the last six games saw them finish rock-bottom.

Season review

Results summary

Results by round

Fixtures and results

Third Division

FA Cup

Football League Cup

Welsh Cup

League table

External links
 Newport County 1986-1987 : Results
 Newport County football club match record: 1987
 WELSH CUP 1986/87

1986-87
Newport County
Newport County